Fred Thomas Wood (21 December 1917 – 22 September 1994) was a Chilean footballer. He played in two matches for the Chile national football team in 1947. He was also part of Chile's squad for the 1947 South American Championship.

References

External links
 

1917 births
1994 deaths
Chilean footballers
Chile international footballers
Association football midfielders
Santiago Morning footballers
Colo-Colo footballers
Universidad de Chile footballers